The expressway 24 ( / Brzi put 24) is an expressway in Serbia, that links the A1 motorway with Kragujevac, at the State road 23. Section between Kragujevac and Cvetojevac has three lanes (including emergency lane) in each direction, while the rest of the route has two lanes in each direction.

Route

Table's current progress status is as of November 2019.

See also 
 Roads in Serbia
 State Road 24

Expressways in Serbia
Transport in Serbia